Mihaela Băbeanu (née Smedescu; born 1 March 1986 in Slatina, Romania) is a Romanian handballer who plays for the club HCM Râmnicu Vâlcea.

Achievements 
Romanian Championship:
Silver Medalist: 2013
Romanian Cup:
Winner: 2013
EHF Champions League:
Finalist: 2010
Semifinalist: 2009, 2012
EHF Cup Winners' Cup:
Winner: 2007
European Championship:
Bronze Medalist: 2010
Fifth Place: 2008

References

 

1986 births
Living people
Sportspeople from Slatina, Romania
Romanian female handball players
SCM Râmnicu Vâlcea (handball) players